Ras association domain-containing protein 5 is a protein that in humans is encoded by the RASSF5 or F5 gene.

Function 

This gene is a member of the Ras association domain family. It functions as a tumor suppressor, and is inactivated in a variety of cancers. The encoded protein localizes to centrosomes and microtubules, and associates with the GTP-activated forms of Ras, Rap1, and several other Ras-like small GTPases. The protein regulates lymphocyte adhesion and suppresses cell growth in response to activated Rap1 or Ras. Multiple transcript variants encoding different isoforms have been found for this gene.

Interactions 

RASSF5 has been shown to interact with RRAS, RAP2A, MRAS and RASSF1.

References

Further reading